Kieran Duffie (born 4 March 1992) is a Scottish professional footballer, who plays as a defender for Clyde. Duffie started his career with Falkirk, spending 10 years with the side, starting with the youth development system before playing over 160 matches for the first-team before signing for East Fife on 31 March 2017 until the end of the season.

Career

Falkirk
Duffie made his Falkirk first team debut against Aberdeen in the SPL on 2 February 2010. He quickly established himself as first choice right-back and has gone on to make over 100 league appearances for Falkirk in the SPL, SFL and in the combined SPFL.

Duffie has become renowned for being an attacking full-back who likes to break forward at pace and overlap the midfield to get crosses into the box. In season 2011–12, he was a frequent supplier for striker Farid El Alagui and the 28 goals he scored, and it was mainly down to this that he was included in the PFA Scotland Team of the Year for Division One for that year. He was also in the Falkirk side that won the Scottish Challenge Cup during that season as they beat Hamilton Academical 1–0 in the final. After suffering a number of injuries that restricted his playing time, Duffie was released by Falkirk in January 2016.

East Fife
Duffie signed for East Fife in March 2017.

International career
Duffie has represented Scotland at under-17, under-19 and under-21 level.

Career statistics

Honours
Falkirk
Scottish Challenge Cup: 2011–12

References

External links

Falkirk F.C. players
Scottish Football League players
1992 births
Living people
Association football defenders
Sportspeople from Clydebank
Footballers from West Dunbartonshire
Scotland youth international footballers
Scottish Premier League players
Scotland under-21 international footballers
Scottish Professional Football League players
East Fife F.C. players
Clyde F.C. players
Scottish footballers